Death of England is a one-man play by Clint Dyer and Roy Williams.

Production 
The play opened at the National Theatre, London in the Dorfman Theatre beginning previews on 31 January, with a press night on 6 February, running until 7 March 2020. The production was directed by Clint Dyer and featured Rafe Spall as Michael.

The playtext was released on 9 April 2020 by Methuen Drama.

Death of England: Delroy 
Death of England: Delroy is a one-man play by Clint Dyer and Roy Williams in response to Death of England as a stand-alone work. 

Beginning previews on 21 October 2020, the play marked the re-opening of the National Theatre, London during the COVID-19 pandemic using social distancing measures in the Olivier Theatre. The production was again directed by Clint Dyer and featured Michael Balogun in the title role of Delroy (originally due to be played by Giles Terera who had to withdraw from the production in rehearsals due to undergoing emergency surgery.)

Despite initially being announced to run until 28 November 2020, the production was forced to close on 4 November 2020 (the production's press night) due to the Government advice of Coronavirus lockdown measures.

The playtext was released on 21 October 2020 by Methuen Drama.

On 27 November 2020, the play was streamed on YouTube for 24 hours, filmed on 4th November (the press and closing night).

The play is due to return to the Olivier stage at the National Theatre in spring 2021 with Balogun reprising the role of Delroy.

References 

2020 plays
British plays
Plays for one performer
Plays set in London
Plays set in England